Michael Zimmer (born 18 November 1955) is a former professional German footballer.

Zimmer made a total of 21 appearances in the Fußball-Bundesliga and 26 in the 2. Bundesliga for Tennis Borussia Berlin during his playing career.

References 
 

1955 births
Living people
German footballers
Association football midfielders
Bundesliga players
2. Bundesliga players
Tennis Borussia Berlin players